Matt Tuttle may refer to:

 Matt Tuttle (musician), drummer for the post-hardcore band Adair
 Matt Tuttle (soccer) (born 1987), American soccer player